The Russell Subdivision is a railroad line owned by CSX Transportation in the U.S. state of Kentucky. At its south end the line continues north from the Kanawha Subdivision of the Florence Division and at its north end the line continues north as the Northern Subdivision.

See also
 List of CSX Transportation lines

References

CSX Transportation lines
Rail infrastructure in Kentucky
Transportation in Greenup County, Kentucky